Nellie K. Morrow Parker (August 27, 1902 – January 25, 1998) was the first African American school teacher in Bergen County, New Jersey. Part of the Hackensack Public Schools, Nellie K. Parker Elementary School in Hackensack, New Jersey is named after her.

Birth
She was born as Nellie K. Morrow to Mary A. (1875-?) and John Eugene Morrow (1873-?) aka Eugene Morrow, on August 27, 1902, in Hackensack, New Jersey. John was the janitor of the Johnson Public Library at 274 Main Street in Hackensack and also a minister
. He was born in North Carolina. Nellie had the following siblings: Eugene Abram Morrow (1897-?); E. Frederic Morrow (1907–1994), the first African American to hold an executive position at the White House; John H. Morrow, Sr. (1910-2000), the first United States ambassador to independent Guinea; and William H. Morrow (1910-?).

Morrow graduated from Hackensack High School and graduated from Montclair Normal School (now Montclair State University) in 1922 with a certificate in teaching.

Teacher
She became the first African-American public school teacher in Bergen County, New Jersey in 1922 when she was hired to teach the fifth and sixth grades in the Hackensack, New Jersey public school system. Nellie remained in the Hackensack school system for 42 years.  During this entire time span, she moved only once from First Street School to the Beech Street School.  During her early years of teaching she and her family were subject to racism from the Ku Klux Klan and other organizations.

Marriage
In 1928 she married William L. Parker (1900-?) of Virginia. William worked as a salesman for a life insurance company.

Death
She died in 1998 in Huntington Beach, California.

References

World War I draft with John Eugene Morrow, b. September 19, 1873
World War I draft with Eugene Abram Morrow, b. December 4, 1897
1900 US Census
1910 US Census with "Nellie Morrow"
1920 US Census
1930 US Census with "Nellie K. Parker"

Further reading

1902 births
1998 deaths
20th-century American educators
Hackensack High School alumni
People from Hackensack, New Jersey
Montclair State University alumni
Educators from New Jersey
20th-century American women educators